Club Atlético Almirante Brown (mostly known as Brown de Arrecifes) is an Argentine sports club from the city of Arrecifes, in Buenos Aires Province. Although other sports are practised there, Brown is mostly known for its football team, which currently plays in the Arrecifes football league.

Almirante Brown, founded on 14 October 1917, by José Ryan and Stegmann. The colours of the club are related to the origins of its founders: black (taken from the German flag) and green (the Irish traditional colour).

Brown won the 1995–96 Torneo Argentino B promoting to the upper division with Mataderos, a club from Necochea. A year after, on 28 June 1997, the team reached the Primera B Nacional (the second division of the Argentine football league system) later defeating Sportivo Ben Hur 1–0 in Rafaela, Santa Fe Province. The team was coached by Rodolfo Motta.

During its debut season in the Primera B Nacional, Brown finished 6th in the first stage but then was relegated to the last position in the B group. Brown made its best performance in the 2000–01 season, being near to promote to First Division although the team was defeated by San Martín de Mendoza before reaching the semi-finals. Brown played in the second division until 2003, when the team was relegated to the lower division.

Titles
Torneo Argentino A: 1
 1996–97
Torneo Argentino B: 1
 1995–96
Liga de Fútbol de Arrecifes: 18

References

External links
Los de Siempre 

 
Association football clubs established in 1917
Football clubs in Buenos Aires Province
Arrecifes
1917 establishments in Argentina